Kjerstin Boge Solås (born 31 December 1997) is a Norwegian handball player for Siófok KC and the Norway women's national handball team.

She also represented Norway in the 2016 Women's Junior World Handball Championship, placing 5th, at the 2015 Women's Under-19 European Handball Championship, placing 6th and at the 2014 Women's Youth World Handball Championship, placing 13th.

Achievements
European Championship
Winner: 2016

References

1997 births
Living people
People from Fjaler
Norwegian female handball players
Sportspeople from Vestland